Yerong Creek is a town in the Riverina area of southern New South Wales, Australia.

Yerong Creek station is serviced twice daily by NSW TrainLink XPT trains which travel along the Main Southern Railway line between Sydney and Melbourne (there is no stop listed in timetables for Yerong Creek; the nearest stations are The Rock to the north and Henty to the south). The town is home to a small population and was the original home of the vintage rally.

Yerong Creek Post Office opened on 1 October 1882.

Yerong Creek was also home to the vintage rally, though this event is no longer held.

Gallery

References

External links

Towns in the Riverina
Lockhart Shire